The 1903 Franklin Athletic Club football season  was their third and final season in existence. The team finished with a record of 12-0. The team was named the top football team in the United States. Franklin went on to win the 1903 World Series of Football, held in December, at Madison Square Garden and did not give up a score all season.

Schedule

Game notes

References

Greensburg Athletic Association
Franklin Athletic Club football seasons
Greensburg Athletic Association